Tomas Scheckter (born 21 September 1980) is a South African former racing driver best known for his time in the IndyCar Series.

Early years
Scheckter was born in Monte Carlo to 1979 Formula One World Champion Jody Scheckter and his first wife Pamela. Scheckter started racing karts in South Africa at the age of 11 and it did not take long for the young driver to reach the podium. He had his first taste of a major championship as a teenager when he captured the South African Kart Championship in 1995. In 1996 he ventured on to the main circuit in the South African Formula Vee series and soon after he was in the South African Formula Ford Series where he posted two wins.

He had proven his speed in South African motorsports and was then off to Europe the following year where he entered the British Formula Vauxhall Junior series where he raced against the likes of Antônio Pizzonia and Takuma Sato. Scheckter earned third in the championship with one victory and one pole. He was also named series Rookie of the Year.

In 1999, Scheckter won the Formula Opel Euroseries championship with a record eight victories and eight poles, and in the process broke all the winning records previously set by Mika Häkkinen, Rubens Barrichello, and David Coulthard. That success landed him a drive that same year in the last two races of the Formula Nissan championship which Fernando Alonso had dominated that whole season. Even though Scheckter was with a new team for this brief stint in Formula Nissan, he captured a win, two poles and a second-place position.

Scheckter moved on to the Formula 3 Series in 2000, and in his rookie year, he was the runner-up in the British Formula 3 Championship with two victories and two pole positions, while contending again with drivers such as Takuma Sato, Antônio Pizzonia and Narain Karthikeyan. He also had time to race in the prestigious Marlboro Masters F3 race at Zandvoort where he took the third podium position. To complete his year, he competed in the final four races of the FIA Formula 3000 Championship, finishing second at Hockenheim behind future IRL teammate Tomáš Enge. He also raced in the Open Telefónica by Nissan, finishing as championship runner-up.

Scheckter was signed as a test/reserve driver by Jaguar for the 2001 Formula One season, but was soon let go after being found "kerb crawling."

IndyCar Series

2002

Scheckter was signed to drive for Eddie Cheever's Red Bull Cheever Racing in the IndyCar Series for the 2002 season. He was the Indianapolis 500 co-Rookie of the year (with 4th placed Alex Barron) after leading 85 laps of the race.  However, Cheever soon grew tired of Scheckter's frequent crashes, and looked to replace him with Buddy Rice.  At Michigan International Speedway, Cheever was forced to race Scheckter due to contractual obligations, but gave Rice the best equipment and crew. In the 2002 Michigan Indy 400, Scheckter won by 1.7 seconds over Rice for his first IRL win, while team owner Cheever crashed out. However, he was soon gone from Cheever Racing.

2003-Mid 2005

In 2003, he moved to Target Ganassi Racing with mixed results, often being criticized for his inconsistency and frequency of crashing, finishing well behind title winning teammate Scott Dixon. In 2004 he moved to Panther Racing to replace double champion Sam Hornish Jr. In 2004 and 2005, Scheckter and Panther were the dominant Chevrolet powered team, greatly outpacing other teams powered by what many considered the weakest engine in the series.  Scheckter broke through a horrendous string of bad luck, defeating Hornish to win the Bombardier Learjet 500 at Texas Motor Speedway in June 2005 for his second career victory.

Mid 2005-07

In mid-2005, Scheckter was announced as one of the drivers for A1 Team South Africa in the inaugural A1 Grand Prix series. He raced in the rounds at EuroSpeedway Lausitz and Estoril. In 2006, Scheckter drove for Tony George and Patrick Dempsey's Vision Racing alongside teammate Ed Carpenter and finished 10th in points. In 2007, Scheckter again raced for Vision Racing sponsored by Joost. The South African was one of the few drivers that year to challenge the Team Penske, Andretti Green Racing and Target Chip Ganassi Racing drivers on a regular basis during races, on occasion leading races. He ultimately finished 10th in points for the second season in a row with a best finish of fifth.

2008-09

For the 2008 season, Scheckter was scheduled to race for Luczo Dragon Racing in three races: Kansas, Indianapolis, and Infineon. Despite not finishing at Kansas or Indy, Scheckter's runs gave the team additional race time at Texas, Detroit, and Chicagoland. Scheckter failed to return any good results in the additional races despite qualifying well. He did not return to the team in 2009, as it became a full-time team with 2008 Indy Lights champion Raphael Matos.  Scheckter was reported to be joining Beck Motorsports, now renamed Team 3G, starting at the 2009 Long Beach race, but the deal never materialized. Scheckter personally secured sponsorship from MonaVie which he shopped to a number of teams, ultimately signing with Dale Coyne Racing for a second week program. He qualified 26th and finished 12th. Later in the 2009 season he returned with the MonaVie sponsorship with Dreyer & Reinbold Racing sharing the #23 car with Milka Duno, who brought her own sponsorship, as well as driving a third car, the #43, in select races.

2010

In 2010, Scheckter once again brought Mona-Vie to Dreyer & Reinbold Racing to drive the #23 car in the Indianapolis 500. Scheckter had a great race, and was in the top for the majority of the race. In the last 20 laps a fuel mileage problem forced Scheckter to conserve fuel and he dropped back to finish 12th. Scheckter's teammate Mike Conway suffered a leg injury in a terrible crash at the Indianapolis 500 and Scheckter was hired to fill in for Conway at Texas and Iowa finished 15th and 19th at each. Later in the year he was hired to drive for Conquest Racing at Chicago and Kentucky. Scheckter finished 28th at Chicago, but after having a surprisingly quick time in practice and qualifying he was accidentally hit from behind by Alex Lloyd in the first 10 laps and made contact with the wall that ended his day. At Kentucky Scheckter struggled getting the car up to speed and finished 14th.

2011

For 2011, Scheckter joined KV-SH Racing and drive the #07 Team Redline Extreme car in the Indianapolis 500. At Loudon, Scheckter would replace the injured Justin Wilson, driving the number 22 car for Dreyer & Reinbold Racing. Schekter would also drive the number 07 car in Baltimore. For the season's final race in Las Vegas, Scheckter drove the #57 car for Sarah Fisher Racing with Angie's List as the primary sponsor, but the race was red flagged due to a multicar pile up early in the race in which Dan Wheldon was killed.

Personal
He is the son of  Formula One World Champion Jody Scheckter and the nephew of racer Ian Scheckter. He also has an older brother named Toby, and a younger brother Hugo, who often updates Tomas's fans through his Twitter page.

In April 2020, Scheckter announced that he had suffered multiple strokes and required a heart operation at the Mayo Clinic. Scheckter currently resides in the United Kingdom.

Motorsports career results

Career summary

Complete Euro Open by Nissan results
(key) (Races in bold indicate pole position) (Races in italics indicate fastest lap)

Complete International Formula 3000 results
(key) (Races in bold indicate pole position) (Races in italics indicate fastest lap)

Complete Italian/Euro Formula 3000 results
(key) (Races in bold indicate pole position; races in italics indicate fastest lap)

Complete IndyCar Series results
(key) (Races in bold indicate pole position)

 1 Run on same day.
 2 Non-points-paying, exhibition race.

Indianapolis 500

Scheckter started on the fourth row of the Indy 500 his first seven races until 2009, when he qualified 26th.

Complete A1 Grand Prix results
(key) (Races in bold indicate pole position) (Races in italics indicate fastest lap)

See also
List of select Jewish racing drivers

References

External links
 
 IndyCar Driver Page

1980 births
Living people
A1 Team South Africa drivers
Auto GP drivers
British Formula Three Championship drivers
Indianapolis 500 drivers
Indianapolis 500 Rookies of the Year
IndyCar Series drivers
International Formula 3000 drivers
People from Monte Carlo
South African Jews
South African racing drivers
White South African people
Chip Ganassi Racing drivers
West Competition drivers
A1 Grand Prix drivers
KV Racing Technology drivers
Dreyer & Reinbold Racing drivers
Dale Coyne Racing drivers
Dragon Racing drivers
Vision Racing drivers
Panther Racing drivers
Cheever Racing drivers
Conquest Racing drivers
Sarah Fisher Racing drivers
Paul Stewart Racing drivers